The Marigold gold mine is an open pit gold mine in Valmy, Nevada,  west-northwest of Battle Mountain. The mine is owned and operated by SSR Mining Inc.

Gold mineralization at Marigold is finely disseminated within sedimentary and metasedimentary rocks, including limestone, siltstone, breccias, meta-basalts and quartzite. The mining operation comprises 11 open pits, eight waste rock stockpiles, three leach pads, two carbon-in-leach processing facilities and a carbon processing and refining facility.

, the mine had Proven and Probable Reserves of 201.5 million tonnes at an average gold grade of 0.47 g/t, for 3.3 million ounces of gold. An anticipated mine-life, as of June 2018, of over ten years was estimated based on current Mineral Reserves.

The mine is located in northeastern Nevada, in eastern Humboldt County, 36 miles east of Winnemucca and four miles south of Valmy. The mine started production in 1989.  The mine was owned 66.7% and 33.3% by Goldcorp Inc. and Barrick Gold respectively, until February 2014 when Barrick and Goldcorp sold the mine to Silver Standard Resources Inc. for $275 million.

In October 2017, a collision in the open pit portion of the mine killed two workers and injured others. Operations at the mine were suspended pending an investigation from the Mine Safety and Health Administration.

References

External links
SSR Mining, Production and reserve data, accessed 9 November 2019

Buildings and structures in Humboldt County, Nevada
Gold mines in Nevada